Brian Renken (born 21 June 1955) is a Canadian wrestler. He competed in two events at the 1976 Summer Olympics.

References

1955 births
Living people
Canadian male sport wrestlers
Olympic wrestlers of Canada
Wrestlers at the 1976 Summer Olympics
Sportspeople from Thunder Bay
Commonwealth Games bronze medallists for Canada
Commonwealth Games medallists in wrestling
Pan American Games medalists in wrestling
Pan American Games bronze medalists for Canada
Wrestlers at the 1979 Pan American Games
Medalists at the 1979 Pan American Games
Wrestlers at the 1982 Commonwealth Games
20th-century Canadian people
Medallists at the 1982 Commonwealth Games